Free to Be... A Family is a television special hosted by Marlo Thomas broadcast on December 14, 1988. It was especially notable as a joint production of ABC and Soviet Union television (the USSR then three years from collapse). It was nominally a sequel to the popular 1974 ABC Afterschool Special Free to Be... You and Me, also hosted by Thomas. Among the performers on the 1988 show were The Muppets, Jon Bon Jovi, Penn and Teller, Carly Simon, Lily Tomlin, and Robin Williams.

After her husband, talk show host Phil Donahue, hosted a series of U.S.–Soviet space-bridge telecasts throughout the '80s, Thomas decided that this kind of international understanding and cooperation should start at a much earlier age. "The purpose of the special was to emphasize the fact that kids in the U.S. and Russia are much the same and can relate to one another, in hopes of bringing peace between the nations." Prior to the television special, there was a book, with contributions by Christopher Cerf among others, and a record album, both under the same title.

It won the 1989 Emmy Award for Outstanding Children's Program.

Cast
 Marlo Thomas as herself
 Tatyana Vedeneyeva as herself
 Robin Williams as himself
 Lily Tomlin as Ernestine the Telephone Operator
 Carly Simon as herself
 Penn and Teller as themselves
 Jon Bon Jovi as himself
 Jim Henson as Kermit the Frog
 Frank Oz as Miss Piggy
 Kevin Clash as Elmo, Unemployed Bear
 Camille Bonora as Meryl Sheep
 Natalia Derzhavina as Khryusha

Other editions
 A&M Records SP 5196, 1988 soundtrack, Free to Be... A Family
 Family Home Entertainment, 1993 VHS, Free to Be... A Family
 Marlo Thomas. Free to be a Family: A book about all kinds of belonging, Bantam, October 1987,

References

External links

Free to Be Foundation History

1980s American television specials
1988 television specials
Children's television in the United States
Emmy Award-winning programs
Soviet Union–United States relations